Theophil Friedrich Christen (1 April 1873 in Basel – 6 May 1920 in Genfersee) was a doctor, mathematician, physicist, economist and pioneer of physical medicine, in particular of X-ray radiation.
Zeitschrift für medizinische Physik wrote:

In his honor, the Swiss Society for Radiation Biology and Medical Physics established the Theophil-Christen Medal in 2006, first awarded to Jean-François Valley.

Publications
 "Ausbeutungslose Freiwirtschaft : Frei von privater Ausbeutung! ; Frei von staatlicher Bevormundung! ; Stark zur Selbstverantwortung!" (English: "Exploitative Lose Free Economy: Free from private exploitation! ; Free of state paternalism! ; Strong self-responsibility! ")
 "Das Geldwesen: ein dynamisches System" (English: "The Banks: a dynamic system")
 "Die Kaufkraft des Geldes und ihre Bedeutung für die Volkswirtschaft" (English: "The purchasing power of money and its importance for the national economy")
 "Die politische Frauenfibel" (English: "The Women's Political Primer")

References

External links 
 http://www.onmeda.de/lexika/persoenlichkeiten/christen.html

1879 births
1920 deaths
Medical physicists